Lý Hoàng Nam and Sumit Nagal were the defending champions, but were both ineligible to compete this year.

Kenneth Raisma and Stefanos Tsitsipas won the title, defeating Félix Auger-Aliassime and Denis Shapovalov in the final, 4–6, 6–4, 6–2.

Seeds

Draw

Finals

Top half

Bottom half

External links 
 Boys' Doubles Draw

Boys' Doubles
Wimbledon Championship by year – Boys' doubles